National Solidarity may refer to:

National Solidarity (Greece), World War II-era Resistance welfare service in Greece
National Solidarity Alliance, a Peruvian political alliance
National Solidarity Party (Guatemala), a political party in Guatemala
National Solidarity (Peru), a Peruvian political party
Union for Democracy and National Solidarity, an oppositional political party in Benin, part of the Star Alliance